The DUX Bessemer Bend Bridge was a Warren through truss bridge in Bessemer Bend, Wyoming, which carried Natrona County Road CN1-58 (Bessemer Bend Road) across the North Platte River. The bridge was built from 1921 to 1922. When nominated to the National Register of Historic Places in 1982, it was one of only three Warren through truss bridges remaining on Wyoming county highways. In addition, the bridge was located at the site of a historic river crossing on the Oregon Trail.

The bridge was added to the National Register on February 22, 1985. It was one of several bridges added to the NRHP for their role in the history of Wyoming bridge construction.

See also
List of bridges documented by the Historic American Engineering Record in Wyoming

References

External links

Road bridges on the National Register of Historic Places in Wyoming
Bridges completed in 1922
Buildings and structures in Natrona County, Wyoming
Historic American Engineering Record in Wyoming
National Register of Historic Places in Natrona County, Wyoming
Warren truss bridges in the United States